is a trans-Neptunian object that was discovered on April 13, 2004 by NEAT. It has been listed as a cubewano by the Minor Planet Center. It was discovered on 13 April 2004 by NEAT. It has been observed forty-seven times, with precovery images back to 1954. The object has an orbital period of 273.88 years. Its maximum possible distance from the Sun (aphelion) is 45.62 AU, and its closest (perihelion) is 38.7 AU, and currently 39.7 AU from he sun. It has an inclination of 21.9718, and eccentricity of 0.082.

M. E. Brown estimates that is very likely a dwarf planet. A diameter of  has been determined from combined observations of the Herschel and Spitzer space telescopes. Tancredi notes that light-curve-amplitude analysis shows only small deviations, suggesting that  could be a spheroid with small albedo spots and hence a dwarf planet. However, its low albedo suggests it has never been resurfaced and thus is unlikely to have planetary geology.

References

External links 
 

Classical Kuiper belt objects
Discoveries by NEAT
Possible dwarf planets
20040413